The Mars seedless grape is a cultivar of grape that has medium clusters and thick skin. The color of this grape is blue and it grows in hot and dry areas in hot summers. This type of grape is a pest-resistant species and has a taste similar to Concord grape. The Mars grape, which is part of the seedless grape species, is cultivated for purposes such as preparing grape juice, producing jelly and consuming it as a table grape. This type of grape is also popular in cultivation for its species, Venus and Niabel, due to its resistance to climate change, as well as common pests among grapes, such as superficial white fungus and black rot.

See also 

 Thomcord
 Arctostaphylos uva-ursi
 Sultana

References 

Table grape varieties
Red wine grape varieties